Asgarabad-e Kuh (also Romanized as ‘Asgarābād-e Kūh; also known as ‘Asgarābād) is a village in Nazlu-e Shomali Rural District,  Nazlu District, Urmia County, West Azerbaijan Province, Iran. At the 2006 census, its population was 880, in 211 families.

References 

Populated places in Urmia County